The Altiri Chiba is a professional basketball team that competes in the second division of the Japanese B.League. They are based in Chiba, Chiba.

Coaches
 Andrej Lemanis

Roster

Notable players
 Daisuke Kobayashi 		
 Kevin Kotzur
 Leo Lyons
 Yusuke Okada
 Yuto Otsuka
 Evan Ravenel
 Brandon Ashley

Arenas
  Chiba Port Arena

References

External links

Basketball teams in Japan
Sports teams in Chiba Prefecture
Basketball teams established in 2020
2020 establishments in Japan